Au Nom d'une Femme is the name of the second studio album recorded by French singer Hélène Ségara. It was released in January 2000, and achieved a great success in France, Belgium (Wallonia) and Switzerland, remaining to date Ségara's most successful album in terms of sales.

Background 
Second album, Au Nom d'une Femme was composed by various famous artists : as for the previous album, Loigerot, Geoffroy and Marc Nacash worked on several songs, and for the first time in Ségara's career, French singer Calogero composed one of her songs, "Au Nom d'une Femme" (afterwards, he also wrote "Regarde").

In France, there were five singles from this album. The first four were very successful: "Il y a trop de gens qui t'aiment", whose release preceded that of the album, was number one and achieved Platinum status, "Elle, tu l'aimes..." hit number three and was also Platinum, "Parlez-moi de nous" (number 15) and "Tu vas me quitter" (number seven) were both certified Silver. "Au nom d'une Femme", the last single, was not a success (number 44).

"Tu peux tout emporter" is a cover version of "Amore per te" by the Italian singer Mango.

In December 2000, the album was included in a box set also containing the first album, Cœur de verre, and peaked at number 41 on French Albums Chart.

In 2001, Au Nom d'une femme won a NRJ Music Awards in the category 'Francophone album of the year'.

Commercial performance 
The album had very long chart trajectories in the three countries where it was released. In France, although it was unable to dislodge Louise Attaque's album Comme on a dit, it managed to enter the chart at number two on 29 January 2000, and stayed for four consecutive weeks at this place. It remained for 33 weeks in the top ten, 105 weeks in the top 100 and 109 weeks in the top 200, and hit Platinum status. It featured respectively at number four and number 22 on 2000 and 2001 charts. In 2002 and 2003, the album charted for ten weeks on the French Mid Price Chart, peaking at number nine on 26 December 2003.

In Belgium (Wallonia), the album went to number 28 on 5 February 2000, jumped to number three, then reached number two for two weeks, and finally topped the chart for three not consecutive weeks. It was charted for 33 weeks in the top ten and 75 weeks in the top 40. It was the best-selling album of 2000, and the 23rd one of 2001.

In Switzerland, Au Nom d'une Femme peaked at number nine in its second week, on 13 February 2000, remaining for 20 weeks in the top 50 and 59 weeks in the top 100, which is rather rare for a French artist in this country.

Track listing

Personnel 

Design
François Darmigny – photos
Jean-Jacques Datchary – photos
Patrick Causse – photos
Barejo – cover
Fathia Maghraoui – make up
R.Solde / Alexis – hairdresser
Hélène Busuttil – design

Tracks 1–3, 5, 8, 11

 Michel Coeuriot – progammation, production, conductor
 Stéphane Briand – mixing
 Laurent Faucheux – drum kit
 Laurent Vernerey – bass
 Thomas Coeuriot – guitar
 Celmar Engel – synth programming
 Michel Coeuriot – keyboards
 Anne Gravoin – violin, string director
 Hélène Blazy – violin
 Françoise Perrin – violin
 Jean-Philippe Kuzma – violin
 Annie Morel – violin
 Daniel Dato – violin
Véronique Engelhard – violin
 Arnaud Nuovolone – violin
 Anne Villette – violin
 Jean-Lou Deschamps – violin
 Thomas Tercieux – violin
 Fanny Coupe – viola
 Christophe Gaugue – viola
 Christine Jaboulay – viola
 Setrag Koulakserian – viola
 Mathilde Sternat – cello
 Frédéric Lagarde – cello
 Jean-Claude Auclin – cello

Tracks 4, 6, 7, 9, 10, 12

Sandro Abaldonato – programming and production
Thierry Rogen, Studio Mega – mixing
Xavier Poissonier – assistant
Bertrant Châtenet – assistant (except 10, 12)
Stéphane Briand – assistant (except 9)
Sandro Abaldonato – keyboards
Serge Eymar – Spanish guitar (tracks 4, 6, 7, 10)
Hugo Ripoll – electric guitar (track 12)
Loïck Ponthieu – drum (track 6)
Laurent Verneret – bass (track 6)

Charts and sales

Peak positions

Year-end charts

Certifications and sales

References 

2000 albums
Hélène Ségara albums
East West Records albums
Warner Music France albums